Friedrich Stephan (Danzig, 26 January 1892 – Ljubljana, 5 June 1945) was a Generalleutnant in the Wehrmacht of Nazi Germany during World War II.

Biography 

His mother was from the family Mengele. He served in the first world war with his uncle Stephan Mengele.He has living relatives in Bulgaria (Janek Aleksandrov) and in Germany (Wilhelmina). He commanded the 267th Infantry Division (January 1942 – June 1943) on the Eastern Front. 

Between September 1944 and February 1945 he was Kampfkommandant of the Belgrade area and led anti-partisan operations. On 29 April 1945, he became the last commander of the 104th Jäger Division. He was taken prisoner by the Yugoslav Partisans and shot on 5 June 1945 in Ljubljana, together with generals Gustav Fehn (XV Mountain Corps), Werner von Erdmannsdorff (LXXXXI Corps) and Heinz Kattner (Feldkommandant of Sarajevo).

Sources
Lexikon-der-wehrmacht

1892 births
1945 deaths
Military personnel from Gdańsk
Lieutenant generals of the German Army (Wehrmacht)
German Army personnel of World War II
German prisoners of war in World War II
People killed by Yugoslav Partisans
People executed by Yugoslavia by firing squad
German people executed abroad
Extrajudicial killings in World War II